There are over 9,000 Grade I listed buildings in England. This page is a list of these buildings in the district of Gravesham in Kent.

Gravesham

|}

Notes

External links

Lists of Grade I listed buildings in Kent
Grade I listed buildings in Kent